Miina Turunen (born 1973 in Kouvola, Finland) is a Finnish actress.

Turunen attended , a school in Helsinki which specialises in the performing arts, and graduated from the Helsinki Theatre Academy in 1997 with a Master's in theatre arts. She began her professional career in 1996, starring in the film Sirpaleita, and starred in the 2003 film Sibelius working with Finnish director Timo Koivusalo and actors such as Martti Suosalo, Heikki Nousiainen and Seela Sella.

Filmography
Sirpaleita (1996)
Vastanaineet (1998) – Anna
Sydänten akatemia (1998, TV series) – Marika Vasama
Venny (2003, TV miniseries) – Mathilda 'Tilly' Soldan
Sibelius (2003) – Aino Sibelius
NDA – Salassapitosopimus (2005, TV) – Katariina Salo

References

External links

Miina Turunen at Elonet 

Finnish stage actresses
1973 births
Living people
People from Kouvola
20th-century Finnish actresses
21st-century Finnish actresses
Finnish film actresses
Finnish television actresses